Lorain County Speedway is an auto racing track located in Amherst Township, Lorain County, near South Amherst, Ohio, USA opened in 1949 as a 1/3 mile dirt oval. It was paved between the 1960 and 1961 racing seasons. It is currently a 3/8-mile asphalt oval, with 12 degree banking in both
turns, and slight banking on the straightaways.

External links
Official Lorain County Speedway Website

Motorsport venues in Ohio
Buildings and structures in Lorain County, Ohio
Tourist attractions in Lorain County, Ohio
Sports venues completed in 1949
1949 establishments in Ohio